The 1868 South Carolina gubernatorial election was held for three days from April 14 to April 16, 1868 to select the governor of South Carolina. The election for statewide offices was held simultaneously with the vote on the South Carolina Constitution of 1868. Robert Kingston Scott won the election largely by the support of the newly franchised black voters and became the 74th governor of South Carolina.

Campaign
The Republican Party was formed in South Carolina in 1867 to contest the elections of 1868. Members were chiefly composed of former slaves, and much of their support was derived from the Union League. They nominated Robert Kingston Scott, an Ohioan and assistant commissioner of the Freedmen's Bureau, as their nominee for governor. The platform of the state Republican party for the election was to enact Radical Republican reconstruction of the state.

Reorganizing for the election were the Democrats who had not been active in state politics since the Civil War. They nominated William D. Porter for governor, although he declined the nomination and instead pressed for the voters to simply vote against the constitution. Nonetheless, he remained a Democratic candidate on the ballot. The Democratic platform for the election called for maintaining a policy of white supremacy and disapproval of the Constitution of 1868.

General election
The general election was held for three days from April 14 to April 16, 1868 and Robert Kingston Scott was elected as the first Republican governor of South Carolina. The huge vote by the blacks of the state enabled Scott to cruise to a comfortable win over the Democratic nominee, William Porter.

 
 

|-
| 
| colspan=5 |Republican gain
|-

See also
Governor of South Carolina
List of governors of South Carolina
South Carolina gubernatorial elections

References

External links
SCIway Biography of Governor Robert Kingston Scott

1868 United States gubernatorial elections
1868
Gubernatorial
April 1868 events